Linda Bassett (born 4 February 1950) is an English actress. Her television credits include Victoria Wood's dinnerladies (1999), Lark Rise to Candleford (2008–11), Grandma's House (2010–12) and Call the Midwife (2015–present). 

She was nominated for the BAFTA Award for Best Actress in a Leading Role for the 1999 film East Is East and for the Evening Standard Award for Best Actress for the 2013 revival of the play Roots at the Donmar Warehouse.

Biography
Bassett was born in Pluckley, Kent, England, to a typist mother and a police officer father. Her roles include the award-winning part of Ella Khan in the 1999 British comedy film East is East. Other roles include Mrs. Jennings in the three-part BBC adaptation Sense and Sensibility, Queenie Turrill in Lark Rise to Candleford, Doll in the film Cass.

In film, she first gained notice when she was cast as Gertrude Stein opposite Linda Hunt as Alice B. Toklas in Waiting for the Moon in 1987. She also appeared as Julia Roberts' mother in Mary Reilly in 1996, Mrs. Brenner, the prison official in the 2008 film The Reader and as Cora in Calendar Girls (March). 

More recently she played Grandma in the BBC Two comedy Grandma's House. Since 2015, she has portrayed Nurse Phyllis Crane on the BBC One drama series Call the Midwife.

Theatre
Bassett's career began in the theatre. She initially worked as an usher at the Old Vic whilst a schoolgirl, before enrolling at The University of Leeds. Her first professional work was in community and educational theatre in the 1970s. 

Among her most notable stage roles were those in: 
 In Basildon – Royal Court Theatre London (2012)
 Love and Information – Royal Court Theatre London (2012)
 People – National Theatre London (2012/13)
 Roots – Donmar Warehouse London (2013)
 Visitors – Arcola Theatre London (2014) and Bush Theatre, London (2014/15)
Escaped Alone – Royal Court Theatre London (2016), Brooklyn Academy of Music New York (2017) and BBC Radio (2018)
 What If If Only - Royal Court Theatre London (2021)

Filmography

Personal life
Bassett lives in Kent, in a village close to her birthplace.

References

External links

1950 births
English film actresses
English television actresses
Living people
Actresses from Kent
20th-century English actresses
21st-century English actresses
People from Pluckley